The 2021 Cork Senior A Hurling Championship was the second staging of the Cork Senior A Hurling Championship since its establishment by the Cork County Board in 2020. The draw for the group stage placings took place on 29 April 2021. The championship began on 11 September 2021 and ended on 21 November 2021.

The final was played on 21 November 2021 at Páirc Uí Chaoimh in Cork, between Kanturk and Fr. O'Neill's, in what was their first meeting in a final. Kanturk won the match by 3-17 to 2-13 to claim their first championship title.

Blarney's Mark Coleman was the championship's top scorer with 1-38.

Team changes

To Championship

Relegated from the Cork Premier Senior Hurling Championship
 Ballyhea

Promoted from the Cork Premier Intermediate Hurling Championship
 Blarney

From Championship

Promoted to the Cork Premier Senior Hurling Championship
 Charleville 

Relegated to the Cork Premier Intermediate Hurling Championship
 Kilworth

Participating teams

The seedings were based on final group stage positions from the 2020 championship.

Group A

Table

Results

Group B

Table

Results

Group C

Table

Results

Knockout stage

Relegation playoff

Quarter-finals

Semi-finals

Final

Championship statistics

Top scorers

Overall

In a single game

References

External link

 Cork GAA website

Cork Senior A Hurling Championship
Cork
Cork Senior A Hurling Championship
Cork Championship